Infoganda is a term describing dramatic or literary work that contains both elements of an infomercial and propaganda.  The term has been sporadically used in both the popular media and in blogs since 2001.

Definition
Propaganda is a message with an underlying agenda.  That agenda may be obvious or not.  Typically this term is used to refer to dramatic or literary works created by highly biased government or religious entities.

Infoganda is a form of propaganda in which the message is delivered in a format that imitates an infomercial (a commercial message that purports itself to be purely informational).  An infomercial is a work of commercial speech (typically a television advertisement) whose purpose is to advertise a commercial endeavor.  These commercials can often include fake news anchors that pretend to be neutral observers even though they are all participants in a ruse to sell something. The combination of an infomercial and propaganda is an advertisement or show that pretends to be neutral (typically a news source) that has a real agenda of promoting the biased viewpoint of a large organization, typically a religious or government entity.

History
It was explained to a large audience by Rob Corddry on The Daily Show with Jon Stewart on March 17, 2004. The Daily Show use of the word infoganda was in reference to a U.S. government video released in early March 2004 to many local television stations.  The video featured a short report in local television news format that provided information about recent revisions to prescription drug coverage provided by Medicare.

Infoganda is a relatively new phenomenon.  However, many historical instances of propaganda were very close to being infoganda.  Filmed news reports of World War II, the Korean War, and other wars can be seen as having carried propaganda in a news format.

However, despite superficial similarities with propaganda, the term infoganda refers to a very peculiar kind of propaganda.   The infomercial format that has developed in the U.S. since 1990 has a specific format, which includes fabricated names for the reporters, scripted interviews with other supposedly neutral people, a maximum use of authority-projecting (costumed) professionals (doctors, lawyers, etc.), the use of statistics in the same way that news organizations use it, and other similarities to local news.  Infoganda is the use of this format to sell propaganda to the viewers.

See also
 Advocacy journalism
 News propaganda
 Video news release

Promotion and marketing communications